The Lagoa do Frio Municipal Nature Park is a municipal nature park in the state of Sergipe, Brazil.

Location

The Lagoa do Frio Municipal Nature Park is in the municipality of Canindé de São Francisco, Sergipe.
The park is in the extreme northwest of the state, near the border with Bahia.
It is one of three conservation units in the caatinga biome, the others being the Grota do Angico Natural Monument and the Rio São Francisco Natural Monument.
Operated at the municipal level, the park has not created any agreement for cooperation in developing studies.
Little has been written about the park other than a study of fragmentation of the caatinga biome.

History

The Lagoa do Frio Municipal Nature Park was created by decree 41 of 23 October 2001.
The park became part of the Caatinga Ecological Corridor, created in May 2006.
As of 2013 there was no management plan.

Notes

Sources

Municipal nature parks of Brazil
Protected areas of Sergipe
2001 establishments in Brazil